Marshall University is a public research university in Huntington, West Virginia.  It was founded in 1837 and is named after John Marshall, the fourth Chief Justice of the United States Supreme Court.

The university is currently composed of nine colleges: Lewis College of Business (LCOB), College of Education and Professional Development (COE), College of Arts and Media (COAM), College of Health Professions (COHP), Honors College, College of Engineering and Computer Sciences (CECS), College of Liberal Arts (COLA), College of Science (COS), and University College; and two schools – School of Pharmacy, and the Joan C. Edwards School of Medicine; and a regional center for cancer research. It is classified among "R2: Doctoral Universities – High research activity".

History

Marshall University was founded in 1837 as a private subscription school by residents of Guyandotte and the surrounding area. The landmark Old Main, which now serves as the primary administrative building for the university, was built on land known as Maple Grove, at the time the home of the Mount Hebron Church in what was then the state of Virginia. John Laidley, a local attorney, hosted the meeting which led to the founding of Marshall Academy, which was named after Laidley's friend, the eminent John Marshall who had served as the fourth Chief Justice of the United States from January 1801 to July 1835.

On March 30, 1838, the institution was formally dedicated by the Virginia General Assembly as Marshall Academy; however this institution was not a college level institution as that was understood at that time. In 1858, the Virginia General Assembly changed the name to Marshall College, but this change still did not reflect its status as a true college. The Civil War closed the often financially challenged school for much of the 1860s.

On June 20, 1863, Cabell County, Virginia, was one of the 50 counties separated from Virginia at the height of the American Civil War to form the State of West Virginia, and the college fell within the new state. In 1867, the West Virginia Legislature resurrected the institution as a teacher training facility and renamed it State Normal School of Marshall College. This began the history of the college as a state-supported post-secondary institution.

20th century

With the exception of the Old Main building, expansion of the facilities and the college itself did not begin until 1907, when the West Virginia Board of Regents changed the title of the presiding officer from "principal" to "president" and allowed the creation of new college-level departments.  At that time, enrollment surpassed 1,000 students. The school began offering four-year degrees for the first time in 1920.

In 1937, the college suffered through a devastating flooding by the Ohio River. Numerous structures, such as Northcott Hall and the James E. Morrow Library were extensively flooded. Much of Huntington was also heavily damaged, and as a result, a floodwall was constructed around much of the town to prevent future occurrences.

The West Virginia Board of Education authorized Marshall College in 1938 to offer the master's degree in six programs: chemistry, education, history, political science, psychology, and sociology, as the institution underwent another expansion. In that year the school was accredited as a "university level institution"; however, elevation to university status would remain a contentious political issue for decades to come. Further expansion accelerated after World War II.

On March 2, 1961, West Virginia Legislature elevated the college to university status, thus becoming Marshall University; the legislation was signed by Governor W. W. Barron. The student newspaper, The Parthenon, prepared two front pages for the day, depending on the outcome of the legislature's vote. Also in 1961, WMUL-FM began operations as the first public radio station in West Virginia. The station, which began in the Science Building at 10 watts of power, now broadcasts from the Communications Building with 1,400 watts.

In 1969, the university's athletic program, facing a number of scandals, fired both its football and basketball coaches and was suspended from the Mid-American Conference and from the National Collegiate Athletic Association. The university rebuilt its athletic program back to respectability, and in 1977, the university joined the Southern Conference.

1970 Football team airplane crash

On the evening of November 14, 1970, the Thundering Herd football team, along with coaches and fans, were returning home to Huntington from Kinston, North Carolina. The team had just lost a game 17–14 against the East Carolina University Pirates at Ficklen Stadium in Greenville, North Carolina. The chartered Southern Airways Flight 932 crashed on approach to the Tri-State Airport after clipping trees just west of the runway and impacting, nose-first, into a hollow. All 75 people on board were killed, including 37 players and five coaches. Thirteen members of the team, as well as the members of the freshman football team, who were not eligible to play varsity under NCAA rules at that time, were not passengers.

The following season a new head coach, Jack Lengyel, was hired. The leaders of the "Young Thundering Herd" (to which the team officially changed its name for the 1971 season) were the few players who did not make the trip due to injury or disciplinary action. Fifteen sophomores from the previous year's freshman team were included, as well as a group of freshmen who were allowed to play at the varsity level after the NCAA granted a waiver to its rule barring them from doing so. Three years later, the NCAA would waive the rule for all schools. Completing the squad were players from other Marshall sports programs. They won only two of their 10 games in 1971: a 15–13 victory against the Xavier Musketeers in the season's first home game, and a 12-10 homecoming game victory against the Bowling Green Falcons.

A fountain and plaza at the center of the school campus is dedicated to the victims of the crash. The water does not flow from November 14 until the first day of spring football practice the following year. The tragedy and its aftermath were the subject of several documentaries, including the award-winning Marshall University: Ashes to Glory. The tragedy and the rebuilding efforts were dramatized in the 2006 Warner Brothers feature We Are Marshall, which opened in Huntington a week before its national release date. Many scenes in the movie were filmed on the campus and throughout Huntington.

On February 22, 2023 West Virginia Governor Jim Justice signed House Bill 2412 into law, making November 14 an official Memorial Day in remembrance of the Marshall football plane crash across the state.

From 1970

In 1971 the Williamson and Logan campuses of Marshall University were combined by the West Virginia Legislature to form Southern West Virginia Community College (now Southern West Virginia Community and Technical College).

In 1977 the university founded its School of Medicine, the first professional school and the first doctoral program. Over the next 20 years the school would add doctoral programs in many fields. Twenty years later, in 1997, the West Virginia Graduate College became the graduate college of Marshall University. Its campus is in South Charleston, West Virginia. In 1998, the John Deaver Drinko Library opened on campus. The center includes a 24-hour study center and a coffee shop, and has wired and wireless networking throughout the building. John Deaver Drinko graduated from the university in 1942. In 1997, Marshall merged with the West Virginia University College of Graduate Studies (COGS), with the latter being renamed Marshall University Graduate College. In 2010 the university was authorized to begin offering undergraduate classes in South Charleston and renamed the facility Marshall University - South Charleston Campus.

Marshall's enrollment was 16,500 in 2004. In addition to the main campus in Huntington and the branch campus in South Charleston, West Virginia, the school maintains undergraduate centers in Gilbert, Point Pleasant, and Hurricane, West Virginia. In 1989, Marshall was governed by the West Virginia University Board of Trustees, but this ended in 2000.

21st century

Several new facilities have been recently completed on Huntington campus. These buildings include two new first-year student residence halls, a health and recreation center, an engineering lab facility, softball field, and an artificial turf practice field that is open to the public. The Marshall University Foundation Hall, home of the Erickson Alumni Center, finished construction in 2010. In 2013 Marshall began construction on a new indoor practice facility, a new soccer field and the Applied Engineering complex.
In July 2005, Dr Stephen J. Kopp took over as Marshall University's president and Dr Gayle Ormiston served as the Provost and Senior Vice President for Academic Affairs.

Death of President Kopp and presidential vacancy
On December 17, 2014, the presidency of Marshall University was vacated after the sudden death of Dr Kopp. The Marshall University Board of Governors met on campus in emergency session on December 18, 2014, to begin the succession process, and announced on December 29, 2014, that Gary G. White, a member of the West Virginia Higher Education Policy Commission and former chairman of the Marshall University Board of Governors, would serve as interim president of the university, effective Thursday, January 1, 2015. White resigned from the West Virginia Higher Education Policy Commission to take on the role of interim president and was not a candidate for the permanent position. The Marshall University Board of Governors named Mississippi State University Provost Jerome A. "Jerry" Gilbert the 37th president of Marshall University on October 20, 2015.

Continued growth
Marshall University has continued to expand its academic profile in recent years. The addition of a new school of pharmacy building located on Charleston Ave, adjacent to Hal Greer Boulevard, in Huntington, WV has helped Marshall grow its Health Science Campus. Named after former Marshall president, the Stephen J. Kopp Hall broke ground on June 18, 2018. The new school of pharmacy was completed in August 2019. Along with this, a new student housing complex was built alongside the new pharmacy school and opened in August 2019. Named The Landing, the housing complex offers luxury units for pharmacy, medical, and graduate Marshall students on the Health Science Campus.

In August 2021 Marshall opened the Bill Noe Flight School at Yeager Airport in Charleston, WV. The Bill Noe Flight School  features a 12,000 sq ft. academic building, a hangar, and an aircraft parking apron. The school of aviation offers two undergraduate programs: commercial pilot: fixed wing and aviation maintenance. These programs began accepting students starting in Fall 2021, with additional programs being added in the future.

Other new programs offered by the university include a physician assistant program offered through the Joan C. Edwards School of Medicine, which accepted students in its inaugural class in January 2021.

On October 28, 2021, the Marshall Board of Governors appointed Brad D. Smith as the university's 38th president, succeeding the retiring President Jerome Gilbert. Smith, retired CEO of financial software company Intuit, was already a major benefactor of the university.

At the time of Smith's selection as president, Marshall was already preparing for the November 2021 groundbreaking for its new 77,000 sq ft. Brad D. Smith Center for Business and Innovation. The building was planned to house the Lewis College of Business as well as the Brad D. Smith School of Business. Along with classroom space, the Smith Center will feature a forum and auditorium, computer and finance labs, office space, meeting rooms, and study spaces for students. The center will be located at the 1400 block of 4th Ave in Huntington, WV and is expected to open for students by the Spring 2024 semester.

Academics

Marshall's faculty members include Dr Jean Edward Smith, known for his works Grant and John Marshall: Definer of a Nation, which was a finalist for the Pulitzer Prize in biography. The Higher Education for Learning Problems (H.E.L.P.) program founded by Dr Barbara Guyer assists students with learning disabilities and related disorders complete their college education.

Marshall offers scholarship programs under John Marshall Scholars and the Society of Yeager Scholars.

The university is involved in the arts of the surrounding Appalachian region. The Joan C. Edwards Performing Arts center is a state-of-the-art, 530-seat facility for studies in the fields of music, art, and theatre. The Jomie Jazz Center is a $2.6 million facility that houses the university's study program in jazz.

In 2016, Marshall's Forensic Science Graduate Program ranked #1 in the United States based upon scores on the Forensic Science Assessment Test (FSAT), which is a qualifying test offered by the American Board of Criminalistics. It was the 7th time in 10 years that the program was ranked number #1 overall.

In 2011, Marshall's Digital Forensics Graduate Program was the first program in the United States to obtain full accreditation in digital forensics from the Forensic Science Education Programs Accreditation Commission (FEPAC).

The school's general engineering program was closed in 1970, but was re-established with a graduate program in 1993, and a general engineering undergraduate program in 2006.

Marshall has granted the master's degree since 1938. Building on the School of Medicine, the university began granting other doctoral degrees in 1994. Marshall now offers a PhD in Biomedical Sciences, the EdD in Educational Leadership or Curriculum and Instruction, and professional doctorates in Nurse Anesthesia, Pharmacy, Psychology, and Physical Therapy.

Athletics

Marshall's athletic teams are known as the Thundering Herd. The school colors are kelly green and white. Marshall participates in NCAA Division I (FBS for football) as a member of the Sun Belt Conference. The name Thundering Herd came from a Zane Grey novel released in 1925, and a silent movie of the same name two years later. It was originally used by The Herald-Dispatch sports editor Carl "Duke" Ridgley, but many other nicknames were suggested over the next thirty years including Boogercats, Big Green, Green Gobblers, Rams, and Judges. In 1965, students, alums and faculty settled on Thundering Herd in a vote, and Big Green was given to the athletic department's fund-raising wing.

Marshall is home to 15 NCAA Division I teams that compete within the Sun Belt. Sports at the school include women's softball, swimming and diving, tennis, volleyball, and track and field; men's football, baseball; and teams for both genders in basketball, cross country, golf, and soccer.

Marshall began playing football in 1895 and has a long tradition as a football school. The plane crash on November 14, 1970, that killed 75 people from the 1970 Thundering Herd football team continues to have a lasting impact on the university and Huntington community. November 14, 2020 marked 50 years since the tragedy.

In 2020, the men's soccer team won the National Championship after defeating Indiana, 1–0, in the 2020 NCAA Division I Men's Soccer Championship Game.

Student life

CAB
The student-run Campus Activities Board organizes free campus-wide events. There are more than 200 student organizations at Marshall. Fraternities and sororities have also been an active part of student life here for more than 100 years. Also available to students is the Marshall Artists Series, which brings Broadway, dance, music, comedy, and opera to the university, and two international film festivals. Students can obtain free tickets to athletics, Marshall Artists Series productions and to theater productions at the Joan C. Edwards Performing Arts Center.

WOW Week
Each Fall semester, before the first week of classes in August, Marshall celebrates the Week of Welcome (WOW) for all incoming freshmen students. The week includes several fun activities including: freshman orientation, Build-A-Bison (a build-a-bear style event but students make a mini version of the school's mascot, Marco), RecFest at the Marshall Recreation Center, and a showing of the movie We Are Marshall inside the football stadium. The week is capped off with a class picture and the President's Freshman Convocation; an event where all incoming freshman walk down 4th Ave in Huntington, WV, led by the university president and drumline, to the historic Keith Albee theater in downtown Huntington.

Student Organizations
Marshall is home to over 200+ student organizations and clubs. Students can find and join these student organizations via HerdLink - the school's online portal for student groups.

The Stampede
Formerly the Marshall Maniacs, The Stampede is the university's official student club for Marshall Athletics. By signing up, students receive various perks including: exclusive t-shirt, custom key chain, laptop sticker, a free student guest ticket to home football game of choice, and a HerdPerks discount card. By joining The Stampede, students will become official members of the Big Green Scholarship Foundation and receive all of the perks.

Greek life
There are 15 chapters on campus that are members of one of three communities: the Interfraternity Council (IFC), the National Pan-Hellenic Council (NPHC), and the Panhellenic Council (PHC). Fraternities and sororities have been established on campus for 96 years. Sigma Sigma Sigma, established at Marshall in 1922, was the first of the national organization.

Marshall Rec Center
Marshall has an on-campus recreation center that is open for student use. Nicknamed The Rec, the  recreation center began construction in July 2007 and was completed and opened to the public on February 5, 2009. The facility features an aquatic center with a spa, 3 lap lanes, vortex whirlpool, and leisure area. Other amenities include a three-story climbing wall, a 1/7 mile track, courts for racquetball, volleyball, and basketball, 4 specialized fitness studios, and an  2-floor fitness area with free weights, Nautilus, and cardiovascular machines. The Rec also offers several programs to Marshall students and Huntington community including: swim lessons, outdoor trips, Intramural sports, youth camps, premium fitness classes, safety certifications, and university 1-credit hour PEL courses. The mission of The Rec is to promote health and well-being by providing a clean and safe environment, innovative programs and opportunities for student development within the Marshall community. The vision is to have a lifelong impact on the Marshall community by serving as a destination for healthy lifestyles.

Residence halls
There are ten residence halls located on the main campus, with additional housing on the Health Science campus.

Freshmen students live in one of several residence halls dedicated to first-year students. Living Learning Communities provide student accommodation for those with similar interests. Marshall also provides for student living for upperclassmen. Among them is Marshall Commons, with four residence halls: Gibson, Wellman, Haymaker, and Willis. Each is a four-story co-residence hall, made up of four-person single suites, four-person double suites, and eight-person double suites.

Marshall University broke ground on a new graduate student housing complex on the Health Science Campus of the Marshall University Joan C. Edwards School of Medicine in June 2018. The graduate housing project, adjacent to the Erma Ora Byrd Clinical Center, will feature 200 units for apartment-style living and will accommodate pharmacy and medical students, and resident physicians. The Landing opened in August 2019.

Campus events and traditions

Constitution Week
Each September, the Marshall community commemorates the adoption of the U.S. Constitution and the contributions to our nation’s legal system by university namesake John Marshall, fourth chief justice of the U.S. Supreme Court. Constitution Week is sponsored by the John Deaver Drinko Academy and includes an essay competition, quoits tournament, lecture forum and celebration of John Marshall’s birthday.

Quoits
Held on Buskirk Field this fun game is similar to horseshoes, and was one of John Marshall's favorite pastimes. Quoits are rings of iron that, like horseshoes, are pitched at stakes. The quoits pits on Buskirk Field are particularly busy during Constitution Week activities. Both students and faculty are welcome to play.

Homecoming Week
Each year in October, Homecoming Week is celebrated at Marshall University with a week of fun activities to celebrate current students and welcome back alumni. Every year, a homecoming "theme" is selected by a committee of students, staff and alumni, which drives the entire week of activities throughout both the campus and Huntington. The annual homecoming parade is one of the longest-lasting traditions during the week of homecoming events. Other popular events include a bonfire following the parade, Picnic on the Plaza, Stampede 5K and annual Marshall Family Tailgate. The week is capped off with the Marshall homecoming football game and naming of Mr. and Mrs. Marshall during the football game halftime show.

International festival
The university's annual exposition has been held for more than 50 years and features international foods, world music and dance, and displays representing many different countries and cultures. The November festival is free and open to the public.

Annual fountain ceremony
The Student Government Association holds a memorial service each year on the anniversary of the Nov. 14, 1970, plane crash that took the lives of 75 people, including the Marshall University football team, coaches, staff, community members and crew. The ceremony is held in front of the Memorial Fountain on the Memorial Student Center plaza. As is traditional, the water in the fountain is stopped during the service, to remain silent until spring. November 14, 2020 marked the 50th anniversary of the plane crash.

Notable alumni

 Troy Brown
 Chris Cline
 Doug Chapman
 Mike D'Antoni
 Conchata Ferrell
 Hal Greer
 Jim Justice
 Thomas M. Kromer 
 Byron Leftwich
 Randy Moss
 Rebecca McBrain
 Clint McElroy
 Griffin McElroy
 Justin McElroy
 Chad Pennington
 Rob Redding
 Soupy Sales
 Wallace S. Sayre
 Beau Smith
 Brad D. Smith
 Jim Smith
 Hassan Whiteside
 Rakeem Cato
 Ahmad Bradshaw
 Press Taylor
 Vinny Curry
 Nazeeh Johnson
 Mark Snyder
 Jon Elmore
 Dan D’Antoni
 Frank Gatski
 Eric Kresser

Actors Billy Crystal and Brad Dourif attended the school but did not graduate, as did musician Michael W. Smith. Professional athlete Jason Williams also attended but didn’t graduate.

See also
 Buildings at Marshall University
 Education in West Virginia
 Marshall College High School
 Marshall University – South Charleston Campus

Notes

References

External links

 
 Marshall Athletics website
 

 
Education in Cabell County, West Virginia
Educational institutions established in 1837
Historic American Buildings Survey in West Virginia
Buildings and structures in Huntington, West Virginia
Tourist attractions in Cabell County, West Virginia
1837 establishments in Virginia
Public universities and colleges in West Virginia